"Gimme" is a song by English singer-songwriter Sam Smith, Jamaican musician Koffee and Canadian singer-songwriter Jessie Reyez, who previously collaborated with Smith in their song "Promises". It was released on 11 January 2023, via Capitol Records as the third single from Smith's fourth studio album Gloria. It has reached number 60 on the UK Singles Chart and number 63 on the IRMA chart.

Background 
According to Smith, the video and the song are based around an actual experience they had with Reyez while creating the track in Jamaica. "Me and Jessie were basically drunk, drinking whisky in Jamaica, two in the morning, running around absolutely wasted, like two girlfriends having a laugh."

Composition and lyrics 
"Gimme" is composed in the key of B-flat minor, and follows a midtempo of 105 beats per minute. Smith, Koffee, and Reyez perform with a vocal range of A-flat3 to B-flat4.

The lyrics of the song allude to sexual themes, mainly the chorus. During an interview, Smith elaborates on the song's erotic themes; "I’m a sexual person," Smith states, "I like sex. It’s something I’m teaching myself to not be ashamed of."

Critical reception 
Madison Phipps of Rolling Stone describes it as a sexual track; "with Reyez backing Smith on the thumping, repetitive chorus, the pair are lost in their own lust. 'Come over yah so may mi push yuh body to the limit,' Koffee raps, mirroring the dynamic of her collaborators." Emily Maskell of Attitude states that the track is "a new era of sound" for Smith, positing that "the unabashed neediness of desire and explicitness of queer longing leaves you thinking 'Gimme' will be a staple on the dancefloor for the start of 2023."

In a review of the album, Kitty Empire of The Observer wrote that the song  is a demonstration of how "Smith's vocals drip with yearning" fit with pop music, appreciating the involvement of Koffee and Jessie Reyez. Emma Harrison of Clash also appreciated the trio, describing the song as "a glitter-infused dancehall stormer" with "effervescent vibes and a bold and intoxicating rhythm".

Writing for Pitchfork, Jamieson Cox was less impressed by the collaboration, found it "anodyne at best and grating at worst".

Music video 
A music video for "Gimme" was released online on 13 January 2023. The video depicts the three artists in a club, dancing and performing suggestively with each other.

Charts

References 

2023 singles
2023 songs
Sam Smith (singer) songs
Song recordings produced by Stargate (record producers)
Songs written by Sam Smith (singer)
Songs written by Jimmy Napes
Songs written by Jessie Reyez
Songs written by Mikkel Storleer Eriksen
Songs written by Tor Erik Hermansen
Capitol Records singles
EMI Records singles